William Godfrey "Willie G." Davidson (born 1933) is an American businessman and motorcycle designer, and the former senior vice president & chief styling officer of Harley-Davidson Motor Company.  He was also the head of Harley-Davidson's Willie G. Davidson Product Development Center in Wauwatosa, Wisconsin.  While being generally responsible for approving Harley-Davidson motorcycle designs, he also personally designed several motorcycles for Harley-Davidson, including the Super Glide and the Low Rider, which pioneered the factory custom motorcycle and created an intermediate line of motorcycles between their large touring models and their smaller Sportsters.

Early life
Willie G. Davidson is the son of former Harley-Davidson president William H. Davidson and the grandson of Harley-Davidson co-founder William A. Davidson. Consequently, he grew up around Harley-Davidson motorcycles. Davidson graduated from the University of Wisconsin–Madison and went on to study at the Art Center College of Design in Pasadena, California. While in California, he became aware of bike customization.

Before working for Harley-Davidson, Davidson worked for the design department of Ford Motor Company.

At Harley-Davidson
Davidson joined the design department of Harley-Davidson in 1963. In 1969 he was promoted to Vice President of Styling. His designs during the 1970s included the 1971 FX Super Glide, the 1977 FXS Low Rider, and the 1977 XLCR Sportster-based cafe racer.

Willie was one of the Harley-Davidson executives who joined Vaughn Beals in buying Harley-Davidson from parent company American Machine and Foundry in 1981.

On March 16, 2012, it was announced that Willie G. would retire from Harley-Davidson on April 30, 2012. He is to remain involved as brand ambassador, and in Special Design Projects as Chief Styling Officer Emeritus.

References

Harley-Davidson designers
Living people
Harley-Davidson executives
Art Center College of Design alumni
University of Wisconsin–Madison alumni
1933 births
American people of Scottish descent